Khlong Hat is the southeasternmost district (amphoe) of Sa Kaeo province, eastern Thailand.

History
The area originally was a forest with plenty of Mahat or Lakooch tree (Artocarpus lakoocha) along the canals (khlong). When people moved there, they named the village Ban Khlong Mahat. Later the name was shortened to Ban Khlong Hat. In 1984 Cambodian refugees fleeing from the civil war migrated to the area of Khlong Hat. The Thai government separated the four sub-districts Khlong Hat, Thai Udom, Sap Makrut, and Sai Diao from Watthana Nakhon district and created a minor district (king amphoe) for better administration, effective 15 January 1985. It was upgraded to a full district on 21 May 1990.

Geography
Neighboring districts are (from the south clockwise) Soi Dao of Chanthaburi province, Wang Sombun, Wang Nam Yen, Watthana Nakhon, and Aranyaprathet of Sa Kaeo Province. To the east is Battambang province of Cambodia.

A border crossing into Cambodia is in the eastern part of the district near the village of Ban Khao Din. The checkpoint on the Cambodian side of the border is in the town of Sampov Loun.

Administration
The district is divided into seven sub-districts (tambons), which are further subdivided into 69 villages (mubans). There are no municipal (thesaban) areas. There are a further seven tambon administrative organizations (TAO).

References

External links
amphoe.com

Khlong Hat
Cambodia–Thailand border crossings